Antonio López de Ayala Velasco y Cardeñas (?–1709) was a Spanish noble and politician. He was Count of Fuensalida and Colmenar, and Grande of Spain. He was successively viceroy of Navarra, governor of Galicia, Viceroy of Sardinia and Governor of the Duchy of Milan.

Sources 
Árboles de costados de gran parte de las primeras casas de estos reynos, Luis de Salazar y Castro.
Monarquía española, blasón de su nobleza, Juan Felix Francisco de Rivarola y Pineda, vol. II, pág. 424.

Viceroys of Navarre
Governors of the Duchy of Milan
Viceroys of Sardinia
Counts of Spain
1709 deaths
Year of birth unknown